

Armin Zimmermann (23 December 1917 – 30 November 1976) was a German admiral and Inspector General of the Bundeswehr from 1 April 1972 until 30 November 1976. He joined the Kriegsmarine in 1937.

Awards
German Cross in Gold on 4 March 1942 as Oberleutnant zur See on R-45 in the 4. Räumboots-Flottille

References

Citations

Bibliography

External links
Biography on BMVg website

Kriegsmarine personnel
Admirals of the German Navy
Inspectors General of the Bundeswehr
Recipients of the Gold German Cross
Grand Crosses with Star and Sash of the Order of Merit of the Federal Republic of Germany
1917 births
1976 deaths
People from Blumenau
Brazilian emigrants to Germany